Matt & Toby is a debut studio album by Matt & Toby, a side project of Matt Carter and Toby Morrell (both of Emery). The album was released on November 19, 2012 through Tooth & Nail Records.

History
On January 10, 2011 an official MySpace page for Carter and Morrell's duo-project named The Water and the Well was registered. The page contains three songs: "Do Lord", "Take Me Oh Lord" and "Prodigal Sons & Daughters". The latter two songs later would be re-recorded for Matt & Toby's album. The page was last visited by the founder on January 19, 2011.

On March 5, 2012 an official Facebook page for the same project, but named Matt & Toby, appeared.

Release and promotion

On July 13, 2012 the first song off the album, "Good Boys", was made available as a free download through the official Facebook page of the band.

On October 17, 2012 a lyric video for "What Plays In My Head" was released through the band's official YouTube channel.

On November 1, 2012, Altpress.com premiered the song "Life of the Party" and on November 6, 2012 - a music video for it.

On November 8, 2012, Absolutepunk.com premiered the song "Prodigal Sons and Daughters".

In the support of the album the band toured a "Living Room Tour" from October 15 to November 9, 2012 and from January 26 to February 9, 2013. During the shows Matt & Toby played songs from the self-titled album as well as Emery songs and some covers in acoustic.

Track listing
All songs composed by Matt Carter & Toby Morrell.

Personnel
Matt & Toby
 Toby Morell – lead vocals
 Matt Carter – bass, drums, engineer, guitar, keyboards, programming, vocals

Production
 Brandon Ebel - executive producer
 Matt Carter - producer
 Brett Baird - editing, engineer
 Ryan Clark - design
 Conor Farley - A&R
 Lindsay Gardner - cello, violin
 Troy Glessner - mastering
 Nadia Ifland - cello, violin
 James Kim - trumpet
 Andy King - drums
 Dan Korneff - mixing
 Aaron Lunsford - drums
 Dave Powell - drums
 Aya Sato - photography
 Julianna Smith - cello, violin
 Aaron Sprinkle - creation, engineer
 Blake Strickland - trombone

References

Emery (band) albums
2012 albums
Tooth & Nail Records albums